The ischial spine is part of the posterior border of the body of the ischium bone of the pelvis. It is a thin and pointed triangular eminence, more or less elongated in different subjects.

Structure

The pudendal nerve travels close to the ischial spine.

Clinical significance
The ischial spine can serve as a landmark in pudendal anesthesia, as the pudendal nerve lies close to the ischial spine.

Additional images

References

Bones of the pelvis
Ischium